Robert Lee (c.1837–18 June 1922) was a New Zealand teacher, school inspector and educationalist. He was born in Grantham, Lincolnshire, England on c.1837.

References

1837 births
1922 deaths
New Zealand public servants
People from Grantham
English emigrants to New Zealand
19th-century New Zealand educators
20th-century New Zealand educators